Raymix SC is a U.S. Virgin Islands soccer club based on St. Thomas. The club competes in the St Thomas League of the U.S. Virgin Islands Championship.

Roster

Honors 
 U.S. Virgin Islands Championship:
 Winners (2): 2016, 2017.
 Runners-up (1): 2015.

 St Thomas Soccer League:
 Winners (3): 2015, 2016, 2017.
 Runners-up: .

References 

Soccer clubs in the United States Virgin Islands
2009 establishments in the United States Virgin Islands
Association football clubs established in 2009